A-Z of Rude Health  was a medical series taking a lighthearted look at sexual health. For every letter of the alphabet, a topic of sexual health was covered. e.g. A for Anal, B for Balls, C for Chlyamydia etc. The factual but lighthearted studio segments were presented in a semi-improvised format by Dr Phil Hammond and Dr Annie Evans after scripting discussions between the presenters and Mr Peter Greenhouse, while all three worked together at the Bristol Department of Sexual Health, and the vox pops and comedy pieces were written and performed by Kev F Sutherland. It was broadcast late on Friday night on regional ITV in the Bristol and West area.

The same production team, at HTV in Bristol, went on to produce the first TV series of The Sitcom Trials, also for ITV.

External links
www.drphilhammond.com – Official website
Phil Hammond's Biography : Chortle : The UK Comedy Guide

www.drannieevans.com – Official website

ITV comedy
Television series by ITV Studios